The 1938 Drake Bulldogs football team was an American football represented Drake University in the Missouri Valley Conference (MVC) during the 1938 college football season. In its sixth season under head coach Vee Green, the team compiled a 5–4–1 record (2–1–1 against MVC opponents), and outscored opponents by a total of 194 to 118.

Schedule

References

Drake
Drake Bulldogs football seasons
Drake Bulldogs football